Leina may refer to:

Leina, Pärnu County, a village in Tahkuranna Parish, Pärnu County, Estonia
Leina, Saare County, a village in Pihtla Parish, Saare County, Estonia
Leina (river), a river of Thuringia, Germany, tributary of the Leina